Jianfeng railway station is a railway station on the Hainan western ring high-speed railway located in Hainan, China.

Railway stations in Hainan